Charles Dymoke Green refers to two British Scouting personalities, father and son:
 Charles Dymoke Green, Sr.
 Charles Dymoke Green, Jr.